The 2016 Campeonato Goiano was the 73rd season of Goiás' top professional football league. The season began on 30 January, and will conclude in May.

Teams
Anapolina
Anápolis
Aparecidense
Atlético Goianiense
CRAC
Goianésia
Goiás
Itumbiara
Trindade
Vila Nova

League tables

Group A

Group B

Final stage

References

Campeonato Goiano seasons
Goiano